Tyloderma nigrum is a species of hidden snout weevil in the beetle family Curculionidae. It is found in North America.

References

Further reading

 
 

Cryptorhynchinae
Beetles of North America
Taxa named by Thomas Lincoln Casey Jr.
Beetles described in 1884
Articles created by Qbugbot